The 1999 UNCAF Interclub Cup was the 17th edition of the Central American Club Championship, and the first under the name UNCAF Interclub Cup.  The tournament was organized by UNCAF, the football regional body in Central America.

Honduran club Olimpia defeated Costa Rican sides Alajuelense and Saprissa (defending champions) and Guatemalan Comunicaciones in the final round to win their second tournament in team's history.  The first three ranked earned the right to play at the 1999 CONCACAF Champions' Cup.

Teams
For the first time in competition history, Belizean and Nicaraguan clubs entered the tournament.

First round

Group 1

Group 2

Notes:
Walter Ferretti withdrew for financial reasons. The results of Walter Ferretti's games have been voided and do not count towards the group rankings.

Final round

Final group

 Olimpia, Alajuelense, and Saprissa qualify to 1999 CONCACAF Champions' Cup

1999
1
1999–2000 in Honduran football
1999–2000 in Salvadoran football
1999–2000 in Guatemalan football
1999–2000 in Costa Rican football
1999–2000 in Belizean football
1999–2000 in Nicaraguan football
1998–99 in Honduran football
1998–99 in Salvadoran football
1998–99 in Guatemalan football
1998–99 in Costa Rican football
1998–99 in Belizean football
1998–99 in Nicaraguan football